Wajma (An Afghan Love Story) is a 2013 Afghan drama film written and directed by Barmak Akram. The film was selected as the Afghan entry for the Best Foreign Language Film at the 86th Academy Awards, but it was not nominated.

Cast
 Wajma Bahar
 Mustafa Abdulsatar
 Haji Gul Aser
 Brehna Bahar

See also
 List of submissions to the 86th Academy Awards for Best Foreign Language Film
 List of Afghan submissions for the Academy Award for Best Foreign Language Film

References

External links
 

2013 films
2013 drama films
Dari-language films
Afghan drama films